Thupparivaalan is a 2017 Indian Tamil-language action thriller film written and directed by Mysskin. The film is produced by Vishal, who also stars in the lead role with Prasanna. The film also features Vinay Rai, Anu Emmanuel, Simran, Andrea Jeremiah and K. Bhagyaraj. The film and its titular protagonist were both loosely inspired by British writer Arthur Conan Doyle's detective character, Sherlock Holmes; he has been given the credits in the opening of the film. The film's narrative centres on Kaniyan Pongundran, a detective who starts investigating the murder of a kid's pet dog, and soon finds himself threatened by the criminal behind a much bigger conspiracy.

The film was launched in March 2016, and was released on 14 September 2017. Directed by Vishal, a sequel titled Thupparivaalan 2 was set to release in 2020, with Vishal and Prasanna reprising their roles.

Plot 
 
The film starts with Dhivakar and his family celebrating his birthday, where a sudden lightning strike kills him and his son and burns them to death. At a movie theatre, a man gropes a woman, and a small commotion ensues, which was stopped by ACP Paul Dhanarajan, who later dies in the middle of a police conference. The plot shifts to detective Kaniyan Poongundran, who lives with his associate Manohar. They both come across Mallika through a pickpocketing incident where she gets caught. Later, she comes to work as a housekeeper at Kaniyan's house.

One day, a schoolboy named Naveen, visits Kaniyan and Manohar with the case that his pet German Spitz (inaccurately identified as a Pomeranian), Nemo was shot dead and asked them to find the killer. Naveen gives them the bullet from Nemo's body. Kaniyan finds that it is a 9mm bullet which had been ricocheted from Nemo. At the crime scene, he finds a tooth, whose owner is traced to be Swarnavel, who was formerly a university physics professor who divorced his wife because he blamed her for the death of their son. Most recently, he was living alone and working as a stockbroker. Meanwhile, a shady man named Kamalesh visits a travel agency to deliver a sofa stashed with money to five people who run the agency and who are believed to be assassins: Devil, Muthu, Pritha, a stout man, and a bald man.

Kaniyan recollects a news article about an incident that involves the deaths of Dhivakar and his son and goes to Mrs. Dhivakar's house, where she reveals that thunder occurred in the beginning, followed by lightning, which struck Dhivakar and their son. Kaniyan also finds that Swarnavel was present at a nearby construction site on the day of the incident. He then concludes that it was artificial lightning devised by Swarnavel to kill Dhivakar. When the assassins learn that Kaniyan is on their tail, Devil disposes of the body of Swarnavel, who was killed earlier. Kaniyan and Manohar visit Dhivakar's office and learn that a tender which was to be awarded to Dhivakar is now with Ram Prasad, the chairman and head of the company that Dhivakar competed with. 

Before they could reach Ram Prasad, he is assassinated. Infuriated that their client Ram had to be killed, Kamalesh hires Chinese mercenaries to kill Kaniyan under the pretext of inviting him and Manohar to a Chinese restaurant. Kaniyan defeats them and finds out about Kamalesh's involvement, but Kamalesh is seduced and killed by Pritha before they arrive (but Pritha is seen by Kaniyan while leaving). A police chase occurs as Pritha and the bald man try to escape but are later cornered from all sides. Soon after, the bald man kills himself by performing seppuku, allowing Pritha an opportunity to escape the scene. The next day in a shopping mall, Pritha makes a failed attempt to kill Kaniyan, who is saved by Mallika.

Kaniyan and Manohar meet Police Inspector Madhivanan and ACP Vijayakumar in a hotel, where yet another failed assassin attempt is made. Muthu plans to inject Kaniyan with a poison dart, but Manohar was caught in the crossfire and is rushed to the hospital. They learn that Manohar was hit by the same dart as Paul. Kaniyan goes to the theatre to confirm this and gets to know that on the same day, three tickets were booked by the same person but in different rows. He gets the address from the credit card details. They raid the travel agency, and Devil kills Muthu to cover his tracks. They find some physics books related to lightning as well as a machine that generates artificial lighting. 

Kaniyan receives a threat via SMS, saying that his beloved ones are in danger. He ensures that Manohar is safe in the hospital, but could not save Mallika in time as she was stabbed by Devil. She pickpockets his mobile when he stabs her, through which Kaniyan gets to know about the Inspector who was keeping Devil informed about all the moves and status of the investigation. It is later revealed that Madhivanan was an informer for Devil. Kaniyan, Manohar, and a police team go in search of Devil to a mangrove forest. All of them die except Kaniyan, Manohar, and Vijayakumar. Later, Kaniyan and Vijayakumar are both caught by Devil, as he blackmails them using Naveen (who was also kidnapped by Devil). 

Tied by a rope, Kaniyan reveals how he managed to uncover Devil's backstory and tells him that the police have been informed of the same. Infuriated by this, Devil tries to stab Kaniyan, but Manohar manages to untie him just in time. In the ensuing scuffle, Kaniyan gains the upper hand despite their more or less equal size and skill in hand-to-hand combat; eventually, Kaniyan kills Devil. In his dying moments, Devil tells Naveen that he is sorry for killing Nemo. Later, as Naveen returns home from school one afternoon, he finds a Pomeranian puppy along with a note bearing Kaniyan's name in a basket at his doorstep.

Cast

Vishal as Kaniyan Poongundran, a detective who is called upon to find the killer of Naveen's dog Nemo
Prasanna as Manohar, Kaniyan's associate who helps him with his case
Vinay Rai as John Richardson Holcha/Devil, a man who runs a travel agency and is responsible for killing Naveen's dog Nemo
Simran as Mrs. Dhivakar, Dhivakar's wife who tells Kaniyan and Manohar about her husband's murder
Anu Emmanuel as Mallika, a pickpocket woman who befriends Kaniyan but later gets killed by Devil
Andrea Jeremiah as Pritha, a woman who runs the travel agency and makes a failed attempt to kill Kaniyan, but later killed by Devil
K. Bhagyaraj as Muthu aka Uncle, a man who runs the travel agency and gets killed by Devil
John Vijay as Kamalesh, a man who sends a money-filled sofa to the travel agency and later gets killed by Pritha
Master Nishesh as Naveen, a young schoolboy whose dog Nemo was killed by Devil
Vincent Asokan as Dhivakar, a man who dies due to a lightning strike
Ashvatt as Swarnavel, a former physics professor and now stockbroker who was present on the day when Dhivakar was killed
Dheeraj Rathnam as a stout man who runs the travel agency
Siddhanth Venkatesh as a bald man who runs the travel agency and later kills himself by performing seppuku
Shaji Chen as ACP Vijayakumar, a man who is met by Kaniyan and Manohar and is later caught by Devil
Abhishek Shankar as Police Inspector Madhivanan, a man who is revealed to be an informer for Devil
Jayaprakash as Ram Prasad, a man who possesses a tender which was to be awarded for Dhivakar and later gets killed
Ravi Mariya as Mallika's uncle who forces his niece into pickpocketing but later reforms and offers her a job
Aadukalam Naren as ACP Paul Dhanarajan, a man who gets killed by a poison dart in the middle of a police conference
Ajay Rathnam as Police Chief
Thalaivasal Vijay as Madhavan

Production
In February 2016, Mysskin begun working on a film in thriller genre for Vishal Film Factory. Starring Vishal in the lead role as a Detective, the film was titled Thupparivaalan and was formally launched at a ceremony in Chennai on 10 March 2016. In order to work on the film, Vishal delayed his commitments for Linguswamy's Sandakozhi 2, while Mysskin put back commitments he had for a new film starring debutants Maitreyan and Tanya Ravichandran. Prior to the start of shoot, Mysskin cast several other leading actors and the film was dubbed by the media to be a "multi-starrer". Actress Rakul Preet Singh was cast in a leading role, making her comeback to Tamil films after becoming popular in the Telugu film industry. Likewise actors Vinay and Prasanna were signed to portray supporting roles. Veteran director K. Bhagyaraj was also selected to portray a key antagonistic role in the film.

The film began production in Chennai on 26 September 2016 with scenes featuring Vishal and Prasanna being filmed during the first schedule. Soon after the shoot began, Rakul Preet Singh opted out of the film citing scheduling clashes with her commitments for AR Murugadoss's Spyder (2017), and was replaced by Malayalam actress Anu Emmanuel, who would make her debut in the Tamil film industry. Anu was signed following a test photo shoot in October 2016, where Mysskin asked her to sport a sari. Akshara Haasan was also signed on to portray another pivotal role in the film during the same month and was expected to shoot for the film alongside her commitments in the Ajith Kumar-starrer Vivegam (2017). Akshara later opted out of the project and was replaced in the role by Andrea Jeremiah. Mysskin signed Ashvatt for the pivotal role of Swarnavel, after he was impressed by the actor's earlier performance in his film Pisaasu and Savarakathi. Interestingly, this is the first and the only time that Mysskin had worked with the same actor in three consecutive movies - Pisaasu, Savarakathi & Thupparivaalan.

The film's shoot progressed throughout late 2016 and early 2017, and by May 2017, there were only ten days more of the shoot required. Mysskin revealed that he was inspired by the tales of Sherlock Holmes when writing the film and stated Vishal's character would resemble the detective. Likewise, that Prasanna's character would be along the lines of Dr. Watson from Arthur Conan Doyle’s Sherlock Holmes novels. In August 2017, while filming an action scene, Vishal suffered a minor injury on his knee, while Vinay hurt his shoulders. The pair, however, chose to continue with the shoot to avoid delays. Unlike most Indian films, the makers avoided including multiple songs; the only song in the film is "Ivan Thupparivaalan", written by Mysskin (who sings along with Hemambiga) and composed by Arrol Corelli, who also composed the background music.

References

External links
 

2017 films
2010s Tamil-language films
2017 action thriller films
2017 crime action films
Indian action thriller films
Indian crime action films
Indian martial arts films
Films about murder
Films directed by Mysskin
Indian detective films
Films shot in Sri Lanka
2017 martial arts films